Saraís is a locality located in the municipality of Vall de Boí, in Province of Lleida province, Catalonia, Spain. As of 2020, it has a population of 8.

References

Populated places in the Province of Lleida